Helge Jon Molvig (27 May 1923 – 15 May 1970) was an Australian expressionist artist, considered a major developer of 20th-century Australian expressionism, even though his career 'only' lasted 20 years.  He was born in the Newcastle, New South Wales suburb of Merewether.

Career, influence and reception
Molvig won the Archibald Prize in 1966 with a portrait of painter Charles Blackman and portraits of Molvig by artist John Rigby were hung in the Archibald in 1953 and 1959. He won many other prizes including the 1955 and 1956 Lismore Prize, 1961 Transfield Prize (City Industrial),  1963 Perth Prize (The Family), 1965 David Jones Prize (Underarm Still Life), 1966 Corio Prize (The Publican) and 1969 Gold Coast Prize (Tree of Man X). During the late fifties/early sixties Molvig held weekly, very informal, life drawing classes which were central to the Brisbane art scene at the time, and he was mentor to various emerging artists such as John Aland, Andrew Sibley, Gordon Shepherdson, Mervyn Moriarty, Joy Roggenkamp, Hugh Sawrey and many others. Otte van Gilst became a student in 1958, moved in with Molvig in January 1960 and they married in August 1963.

Molvig was an accomplished and honest portrait painter - painting fellow artists Charles Blackman, John Rigby, Joy Roggenkamp, Russell Drysdale and Barry Humphries as well as many privately commissioned portraits, i.e., Paul Beadle, Sir Charles Moses, Sir Percy Spender, Clem Jones and Dr. Scougall.  His powerful self-portrait is part of the Queensland Art Gallery collection.

Molvig's art was celebrated at Queensland Art Gallery from September 2019 to February 2020 in the form of a major retrospective exhibition named Maverick.  The exhibition opening featured a moving speech by his wife Otte van Gilst who was accompanied by her sons Nick and Alex Bartzis as well as extended family.

Central Australian imagery, symbolism
Molvig's talent came to the fore in 1958/59 when he painted the 'Centralian' series after travelling through central Australia - incorporating Australian Aboriginal symbolism in his own interpretation of the Australian landscape.  Molvig was an emotional and intuitive painter, deeply concerned with humanity and its follies and always invented symbols and a particular 'style' to suit the criteria of the subject he was painting.  This is very evident in his 'Eden Industrial' series 1962 - impressive images of Adam and Eve in an industrialised Garden of Eden, with heavily textured surfaces achieved by burning layers of paint with a blowtorch.

Later the 'Pale Nudes' series (1964) once again show the influence Australian Aboriginal art had on him, and this symbolism was further distilled in the 'Tree of Man' series (1968), painted when he was seriously ill and perhaps already had a sense of his own mortality.

Molvig was a rare human being -  gregarious and straight forward, often too brutally honest for his own good and unable to abide stupidity, but with a gift of true compassion and understanding and gentleness to all living things, including the human race with all its imperfections and this is evident in his work.

Molvig died in Princess Alexandra Hospital, South Brisbane, Queensland after an unsuccessful kidney transplant.

References

'Molvig, the lost antipodean' by Betty Churcher  

1923 births
1970 deaths
Archibald Prize winners
20th-century Australian painters
20th-century Australian male artists
Australian male painters